Open Fire is the sixth and final studio album by American heavy metal band Alabama Thunderpussy, released on March 6, 2007 via Relapse Records. It is the band's first album with new singer Kyle Thomas. The album cover was created by artist Ken Kelly.

Track listing
 "The Cleansing" - 3:58
 "Void of Harmony" - 3:58
 "Words of the Dying Man" - 3:21
 "The Beggar" - 5:15
 "None Shall Return" - 3:19
 "Whiskey War" - 2:46
 "A Dreamer's Fortune" - 3:47
 "Valor" - 3:53
 "Open Fire" - 3:42
 "Brave the Rain" - 4:08
 "Greed" - 4:42

The Japanese release also contained a bonus track, a cover of the Whitesnake song "Still of the Night".

Personnel
 Kyle Thomas - vocals
 Ryan Lake - guitar
 Erik Larson - guitar
 Mike Bryant - bass
 Bryan Cox - drums
 Hormel Flansuego - percussion

References

2007 albums
Albums with cover art by Ken Kelly (artist)
Alabama Thunderpussy albums
Relapse Records albums